Model X or X-model or variant may refer to:

Vehicles
 Tesla Model X, mid-size all-electric luxury sports activity coupé (SAC)
 Matchless Model X, motorcycle
 BMW X Models
 Duesenberg Model X

In fiction
 Biometal Model X, fictional metal from Mega Man ZX

See also
Smith & Wesson Model 10
MAC-10
X (disambiguation)
MX (disambiguation)
Model 10 (disambiguation)